James Edward "Snooky" Pryor (September 15, 1919 or 1921 – October 18, 2006) was an American Chicago blues harmonica player.  He claimed to have pioneered the now-common method of playing amplified harmonica by cupping a small microphone in his hands along with the harmonica, although on his earliest records, in the late 1940s, he did not use this method.

Career
Pryor was born in Lambert, Mississippi, United States. He developed a country blues style influenced by Sonny Boy Williamson I (John Lee Williamson) and Sonny Boy Williamson II (Aleck Ford "Rice" Miller). In the mid-1930s, in and around Vance, Mississippi, Pryor played in impromptu gatherings of three or four harmonica players, including Jimmy Rogers, who then lived nearby and had yet to take up playing the guitar. Pryor moved to Chicago around 1940.

While serving in the U.S. Army he would blow bugle calls through a PA system, which led him to experiment with playing the harmonica that way. However, most  historians credit the idea to Little Walter. Upon discharge from the Army in 1945, he obtained his own amplifier and began playing harmonica at the outdoor Maxwell Street Market, becoming a regular on the Chicago blues scene.

Pryor recorded some of the first post-war Chicago blues in 1948, including "Telephone Blues" and "Snooky & Moody's Boogie", with the guitarist Moody Jones, and "Stockyard Blues" and "Keep What You Got", with the singer and guitarist Floyd Jones. "Snooky & Moody's Boogie" is of considerable historical significance: Pryor claimed that the harmonica virtuoso Little Walter directly copied the signature riff of Pryor's song in the opening eight bars of his blues harmonica instrumental "Juke," an R&B hit in 1952. This claim is historically questionable at best. During the 1950s, Pryor regularly toured in the South. In 1967, Pryor moved to Ullin, Illinois. He quit music and worked as a carpenter in the late 1960s but was persuaded to make a comeback. Blues fans later revived interest in his music, and he resumed recording occasionally until his death in nearby Cape Girardeau, Missouri, at the age of 85.

In January 1973 he performed alongside Homesick James with the American Blues Legends '73 tour, which played throughout Europe. On this tour they recorded an album in London, Homesick James & Snooky Pryor, for Jim Simpson's label, Big Bear Records, with Pryor also recording a solo album, Shake Your Boogie.

Pryor appeared on Bob Margolin's 1995 Alligator Records release My Blues and My Guitar.

Some of his better-known songs are "Judgement Day" (1956), "Crazy 'Bout My Baby" (from Snooky, 1989), "Where Did You Learn to Shake It Like That" (from Tenth Anniversary Anthology, 1989), and "Shake My Hand" (1999).

Pryor's son Richard "Rip Lee" Pryor is also a blues musician and performs in and around his hometown of Carbondale, Illinois.

Discography

Singles
"Boogie" (A-side) / "Telephone Blues" (B-side) (1948), Planet
"Boogy Fool" (A) / "Raisin’ Sand" (B) (1949), JOB
"I’m Getting Tired" (A) / "Going Back on the Road" (B) (1952), JOB
"Cryin’ Shame" (A) / "Eighty Nine Ten" (B) (1953), JOB
"Crosstown Blues" (A) / "I Want You For Myself" (B) (1954), Parrot
"Someone to Love Me" (A) / "Judgement Day" (B) (1956), Vee-Jay
"Boogie Twist" (A) / "Uncle Sam Don’t Take My Man" (B) (1963), JOB

Albums
Snooky Pryor (1970), Flyright Records FLY 100, made in England
Homesick James & Snooky Pryor (1973), Virgin Records, London under licence from Big Bear Records, Birmingham
Do It If You Want To (1973), ABC Records, Los Angeles, New York
Shake Your Boogie (1974), Big Bear Records, Birmingham
Snooky (1989), Blind Pig Records
Snooky Pryor (1991), Paula Records
Johnny Shines and Snooky Pryor: Back to the Country (1991), Blind Pig Records
Snooky Pryor: Too Cool to Move (1992), Antone's Records
In This Mess Up to My Chest (1994), Antone's Records
Mind Your Own Business (1996), Antone's Records
Snooky Pryor: Shake My Hand (1999), Blind Pig Records
Double Shot!, Snooky Pryor and Mel Brown (2000), Electro-Fi Records
 Super Harps II, with Carey Bell, Lazy Lester, Raful Neal (2001), Telarc Records
Snooky Pryor and His Mississippi Wrecking Crew (2002), Electro-Fi Records
Mojo Ramble (2003), Electro-Fi Records

Appears on 

 American Blues Legends '73 (1973), Big Bear Records

See also
Chicago Blues Festival
List of Chicago blues musicians
List of harmonica blues musicians
San Francisco Blues Festival

References

External links
[ Biography]. AllMusic.
Pryor Biography. Blind Pig Records.
Pryor bio. Hohner Harmonica Company, which has a Pryor sound clip (mp3 format).
Obituary. The Guardian. Accessed December 1, 2006.
Obituary. KLBC radio. Accessed December 1, 2006.
Pryor Discography. Accessed December 19, 2007.

Interview on Canoe, July 2000. Accessed December 1, 2006.

1921 births
2006 deaths
American blues harmonica players
American blues singers
Songwriters from Mississippi
Blues musicians from Mississippi
American street performers
Harmonica blues musicians
Vee-Jay Records artists
People from Lambert, Mississippi
Blind Pig Records artists
Telarc Records artists
Virgin Records artists
ABC Records artists
African-American male songwriters
United States Army personnel of World War II
Southland Records artists
20th-century African-American male singers
21st-century African-American male singers